María Guadalupe Sánchez Santiago (born 7 September 1951) is a Mexican politician affiliated with the PRI. As of 2013 she served as Deputy of the LXII Legislature of the Mexican Congress representing Tlaxcala.

References

1951 births
Living people
Politicians from Tlaxcala
Women members of the Chamber of Deputies (Mexico)
Institutional Revolutionary Party politicians
21st-century Mexican politicians
21st-century Mexican women politicians
Central University of Venezuela alumni
National Autonomous University of Mexico alumni
20th-century Mexican politicians
20th-century Mexican women politicians
Members of the Congress of Tlaxcala
Deputies of the LXII Legislature of Mexico
Members of the Chamber of Deputies (Mexico) for Tlaxcala